The Blagoveshchensk-Heihe Bridge is a bridge across the Amur River, connecting the cities of Blagoveshchensk, Russia, and Heihe, China. According to CNN, the construction of the bridge started in 2016 and was completed in late 2019. It was estimated that the bridge cost 18.8 billion rubles.

Regular bridge traffic started on June 10, 2022. The new crossing between China and Russia is currently available only for freight traffic.

References

Bridges in Russia
Bridges in China
Bridges completed in 2019
International bridges
2019 establishments in Russia
2019 establishments in China
Blagoveshchensk
Heihe
Bridges over the Amur